Liver X receptor beta (LXR-β) is a member of the nuclear receptor family of transcription factors.  LXR-β is encoded by the  gene (nuclear receptor subfamily 1, group H, member 2).

Function 
The liver X receptors (LXRs) were originally identified as orphan members of the nuclear receptor superfamily because their ligands were unknown. Like other receptors in the family, LXRs heterodimerize with retinoid X receptor and bind to specific response elements (LXREs) characterized by direct repeats separated by 4 nucleotides. Two genes, alpha (LXRA) and beta, are known to encode LXR proteins.

Structure
Crystal structure of human liver X receptor β(LXRβ) forming heterodimer with its partner retinoid X receptor α(RXRα) on its cognate element, an AGGTCA direct repeat spaced by 4 nt shows an extended X-shaped arrangement, with DNA- and ligand-binding domains crossed. The LXRβ core binds DNA via canonical contacts and auxiliary DNA contacts that enhance affinity for the response element.

Interactions 

Liver X receptor beta has been shown to interact with NCOA6 and Retinoid X receptor alpha.

References

Further reading 

 
 
 
 
 
 
 
 
 
 
 
 
 
 
 
 

Intracellular receptors
Transcription factors